Stasov (sometimes spelt Stassov) is one of the oldest aristocratic families in Russia founded in the 15th century by the 1st Duke Stasov Dmitri Vasilevich. It’s a quintessential family of Russian intelligentsia.        

  
 
Prominent figures: 
 the famous architect Vasily Petrovich Stasov (1769–1848),
 His daughter Nadezhda Vasilievna Stasova (1822–1895), was a philanthropist and women's rights activist. She organized week-end schools for workers and daycares for workers’ children. She also helped found the Bestuzhev Courses, which made higher education available to Russian women for the first time.
 His son, Dmitry Vasilievich Stasov (1828–1918), was a notable advocate who took part in the foundation of the Russian Music Society. 
 Dmitry's daughter Elena Dmitryevna Stasova (1873–1966), joined the Communist movement in 1898. As a leader of the Bolshevik Party in St. Petersburg she was exiled to Siberia in 1913–16. After the Russian Revolution of 1917 Stasova was a secretary of the Bolshevik party and from 1921-1926 a Comintern representative to the Communist Party of Germany.
 His son Vladimir Vasilievich Stasov (1824–1906), was the most respected Russian critic during his lifetime. 

Russian families